Don't is a 1974 short American documentary film following the life cycle of the monarch butterfly, directed by Robin Lehman. It won an Oscar at the 47th Academy Awards in 1975 for Best Documentary Short Subject.

References

External links

Don’t: The Metamorphosis of the Monarch Butterfly at Phoenix Learning Group

1974 films
1974 documentary films
1974 short films
1974 independent films
1970s short documentary films
American short documentary films
American independent films
Best Documentary Short Subject Academy Award winners
Documentary films about nature
Films about insects
1970s English-language films
1970s American films